Blackhawk Christian School, established in 1973 in northeastern Fort Wayne, Indiana, United States, is a private K-12 Christian school with an enrollment of approximately 950 students PK-12 and is operated by Blackhawk Ministries. The school's motto is "Preparing Hearts and Minds to Serve Christ" Mark Harmon is currently the principal of the Secondary School, Doug Picket is principal of the Intermediate School, Kimberly Brown is the principal of the Primary School, and Kevin Newbry is the Head of Schools.

Blackhawk Christian is ranked academically as one of the top schools in the Fort Wayne area. In 2009, it was the only school in the 11 counties in northeast Indiana area to graduate 100% of its students. In 2008, 93% of Blackhawk Christian students passed the ISTEP+ GQE exam. Blackhawk Christian School students' average SAT score is 100+ points higher than the state and national average. Ninety percent of Blackhawk graduates go on to some form of higher education.

Athletics
“Our Best for His Glory”
is the motto of Blackhawk Christian athletics. 

As a member of the IHSAA (Indiana High School Athletic Association), Blackhawk Christian School provides athletic competition in 16 sports at the high school level.  Blackhawk has achieved 60 Sectional Championships, 23 Regional Championships, 7 Semi-State Championships, and 6 State Championships!

See also
 List of high schools in Indiana

References

External links
 Blackhawk Christian School

Christian schools in Indiana
Private high schools in Indiana
Schools in Fort Wayne, Indiana
Private middle schools in Indiana
1973 establishments in Indiana
Educational institutions established in 1973